

Events

January
 January 10: The Simpsons episode "Bart Gets Hit by a Car" first airs, with Dr. Nick Riviera and Lionel Hutz making their debuts.
 January 24: The Simpsons episode "One Fish, Two Fish, Blowfish, Blue Fish" first airs, guest starring Larry King and George Takei. 
 January 31: The Simpsons episode "The Way We Was" first airs, being the first flashback episode of the series.

February
 February 7: The Simpsons episode "Homer vs. Lisa and the 8th Commandment" first airs, with Troy McClure making his debut, voiced by Phil Hartman.
 February 14: The Simpsons episode "Principal Charming" first airs, with Groundskeeper Willie, Hans Moleman and Squeaky Voiced Teen making their debuts.
 February 21: The Simpsons episode "Oh Brother, Where Art Thou?" first airs, with Herb Powell and Mona Simpson making their debuts.

March
 March 7: The Simpsons episode "Bart's Dog Gets an "F"" first airs, guest starring Tracey Ullman. After the episode, the music video for Deep, Deep Trouble is first broadcast.
 March 20: The animation studio Rough Draft Studios is founded.
 March 26: 63rd Academy Awards:
 Creature Comforts by Nick Park wins the Academy Award for Best Animated Short Film.
 March 28: The Simpsons episode "Old Money" first airs, with Professor Frink making his debut.
 March 31: The first episode of Darkwing Duck, broadcast by the Walt Disney Company, airs.

April
 April 11: The Simpsons episode "Brush with Greatness" first airs, guest starring Ringo Starr. 
 April 25: The Simpsons episode "Lisa's Substitute" first airs, guest starring Dustin Hoffman, who is credited as Sam Etic. The episode is further notable for fleshing out Lisa Simpson's character.

May
 May 2: The Simpsons episode "The War of the Simpsons" first airs, with Snake Jailbird making his debut.
 May 9: The Simpsons episode "Three Men and a Comic Book" first airs, with Comic Book Guy and Radioactive Man making their debuts.

July
 July 11: The Simpsons episode "Blood Feud" first airs.
 July 26: The American film studio Animal Logic is founded.

August
 August 2: 
 Don Bluth's film Rock-a-Doodle premiers.
 The film Rover Dangerfield, which features a dog modeled after and voiced by comedian Rodney Dangerfield, premiers.
 August 11 - The first episodes of Doug, Rugrats, and The Ren & Stimpy Show air.

September
 September 3: 
 The first episode of The Legend of Prince Valiant airs, based on the comics series Prince Valiant.
 The first episode of Little Dracula airs.
 September 7: 
 Hammerman, an animated TV series based on popular rapper M.C. Hammer, premieres, but is cancelled after only one season.
 The first episode of Rupert airs, an animated TV series based on the British comics character Rupert Bear.
 The first episode of Taz-Mania airs, starring the Looney Tunes character Tasmanian Devil.
 September 19: The Simpsons episode "Stark Raving Dad", premieres, guest starring Michael Jackson, who is credited as John Jay Smith.
 September 26: 
 The first episode of Spider! airs.
 The Simpsons episode "Mr. Lisa Goes to Washington" first airs.
 September 28: The first episode of Mr. Bogus airs, an adaptation of a series of French-Belgian claymation shorts, here done in traditional animation.

October
 October 2: Nelvana's critically acclaimed adaptation of Hergé's comics series Tintin, The Adventures of Tintin is first broadcast.
 October 3 : The Simpsons episode "When Flanders Failed" first airs.
 October 10: The Simpsons episode "Bart the Murderer" first airs, where Fat Tony, Legs and Louie make their debuts.
 October 11: Gertie the Dinosaur is added to the National Film Registry.
 October 17: The Simpsons episode "Homer Defined" first airs, guest starring Magic Johnson and Chick Hearn. 
 October 24: The Simpsons episode "Like Father, Like Clown" first airs, where Krusty the Clown is revealed to be Jewish; it also guest stars Jackie Mason.
 October 28: The first episode of Once Upon a Time... The Americas airs.
 October 31: The Simpsons episode "Treehouse of Horror II" first airs.

November
 November 7: The Simpsons episode "Lisa's Pony" first airs.
 November 14: The Simpsons episode "Saturdays of Thunder" first airs.
 November 21: The Simpsons episode "Flaming Moe's" first airs, guest starring the band Aerosmith.
 November 22: 
 The Walt Disney Company releases Beauty and the Beast. 
 Universal Pictures releases An American Tail: Fievel Goes West, a sequel to An American Tail.
 November 30: 
 The first episode of Æon Flux airs.
 The first episode of Liquid Television airs.

December
 December 5: The Simpsons episode "Burns Verkaufen der Kraftwerk" first airs.
 December 7: The first episode of A Bunch of Munsch airs on CTV in Canada. In the United States, the series premiered on December 17, 1991 on Showtime, an animated TV series based on the Canadian children's books by Robert Munsch.
 December 26: The Simpsons episode "I Married Marge" first airs.

Specific date unknown
 The animation studio Dong Woo Animation is founded.
 Turner Broadcasting purchases animation studio Hanna-Barbera.

Films released

 January 1 - The Adventures of the Magic Globe or Witch's Tricks (Soviet Union)
 January 18 - The Sensualist (Japan)
 January 25 - Vampire Wars (Japan)
 February 21 - Wizardry (Japan)
 February 22 - Psychic Wars (Japan)
 March 1 - To Want to Fly (Italy)
 March 9:
 Doraemon: Nobita's Dorabian Nights (Japan)
 Dragon Ball Z: Lord Slug (Japan)
 Magical Taruruto (Japan)
 Who's Left Behind? (Japan)
 March 12 - Okama Hakusho (Japan)
 March 16 - Mobile Suit Gundam F91 (Japan)
 March 21 - Burn Up! (Japan)
 April 5 -  (Japan)
 May 5 - Jang Dok-dae (South Korea)
 May 22 - Free! Whale Peek (Japan)
 May 25 - Robinson and Company (France)
 June 7 - Il Giornalino di Gian Burrasca (Italy)
 June 16 - Beyond the Tide of Time (Japan)
 June 21 - The Seventh Brother (Hungary, Germany, and United States)
 June 29 - Nadia of the Mysterious Seas (Japan)
 July 20:
 The Adventures of Gamba and Otters (Japan)
 Dragon Ball Z: Cooler's Revenge (Japan)
 Magical Taruruto: Burn! Magic War of Friendship (Japan)
 Only Yesterday (Japan)
 Soreike! Anpanman Tobe! Tobe! Chibigon (Japan)
 July 21 - Urotsukidōji II: Legend of the Demon Womb (Japan)
 August 2 - Rover Dangerfield (United States)
 August 9 - Lupin III: Napoleon's Dictionary (Japan)
 August 16 - Huckleberry no Bōken (Japan)
 August 17 - Silent Möbius: The Motion Picture (Japan)
 August 18 - Urusei Yatsura: Always My Darling (Japan)
 September 6: 
 Darkwing Duck: Darkly Dawns the Duck (United States)
 Hisaichi Ishii's Great Political World (Japan)
 September 11 - The Christmas Tree (United States and Brazil)
 September 14 - Roujin Z (Japan)
 September 19 - The Magic Riddle (Australia)
 October 11 - Sebastian Star Bear: First Mission (Netherlands)
 November 2 - Ranma ½: Big Trouble in Nekonron, China (Japan)
 November 21 - Christmas in January (Japan)
 November 22:
 An American Tail: Fievel Goes West (United States and United Kingdom)
 Beauty and the Beast (United States)
 Ninja Ryūkenden (Japan)
 December 10 - Heukkkokdujanggun (South Korea)
 December 14:
 Charlie Strapp and Froggy Ball Flying High (Sweden)
 Gekkō no Pierce: Yumemi to Gin no Bara no Kishi-dan (Japan)
 December 19 - The Pirates of Dark Water: The Saga Begins (United States and Philippines)
 December 20 - The Princess and the Goblin (United States, United Kingdom, Hungary, and Japan)
 December 28 - Dark Cat (Japan)
 December 29 - The White Camel (Belgium, France, and Luxembourg)
 Specific date unknown:
 Ali Baba (Australia)
 The Count of Monte-Cristo (Australia)
 The Emperor's New Clothes (Australia)
 Eneida (Soviet Union and Ukraine)
 Filemon i przyjaciele (Poland)
 Frank Enstein (Australia)
 Goldilocks and the Three Bears (Australia)
 Hans and the Silver Skates (Australia)
 The Holiday of the New Year Tree (Soviet Union)
 The Legend of Zorro (Italy, Japan, and Switzerland)
 Ness and Nessy (Latvia)
 Robin Hood (Italy, Japan, and United Kingdom)
 Underwater Berets (Soviet Union)
 White Fang (Australia)

Television series debuts

Television series endings

Births

January
 January 18: Britt McKillip, Canadian actress and singer (voice of Princess Cadance in My Little Pony: Friendship is Magic, Lola Bunny in Baby Looney Tunes, Bingo Cherry in Coconut Fred's Fruit Salad Island, Goldilocks in Dragon Tales, Stella in ToddWorld, Harumi in Ninjago).
 January 25: Ariana DeBose, American actress, dancer, and singer (voice of Asha in Wish, Danielle in the Human Resources episode "Rutgers is for Lovers").

February
 February 10: Emma Roberts, American actress (voice of Wilma in The Flight Before Christmas, Wedgehead in UglyDolls, Amanda Barrington in the Family Guy episode "No Country Club for Old Men").

March
 March 5: Emi Lo, American voice actor (Funimation, Bang Zoom! Entertainment).

April
 April 10: AJ Michalka, American actress and singer (voice of Stevonnie in Steven Universe, Catra in She-Ra and the Princesses of Power).

May
 May 29: Saori Hayami, Japanese voice actress and singer (voice of Miyuki Shiba in The Irregular at Magic High School, Yukino Yukinoshita in My Youth Romantic Comedy Is Wrong, As I Expected, Leona in Dragon Quest: The Adventure of Dai, Himawari Uzumaki in Boruto: Naruto Next Generations, Shinobu Kochō in Demon Slayer: Kimetsu no Yaiba, Yor Forger in Spy x Family, Yumeko Jabami in Kakegurui – Compulsive Gambler).

June
 June 1: Zazie Beetz, German-American actress (voice of Diane Foxington in The Bad Guys, Amber Bennett in Invincible).
 June 9: Abe Groening, American television writer and production assistant (Disenchantment).
 June 26: Natsuki Hanae, Japanese voice actor and YouTuber (voice of Tanjiro Kamado in Demon Slayer: Kimetsu no Yaiba, Ken Kaneki in Tokyo Ghoul, Inaho Kaizuka in Aldnoah.Zero, Takumi Aldini in Food Wars: Shokugeki no Soma, Kōsei Arima in Your Lie in April, Sieg in Fate/Apocrypha, Korai Hoshiumi in Haikyu!!, Vanitas in The Case Study of Vanitas, Haruichi Kominato in Ace of Diamond, Maki Katsuragi in Stars Align, The Duke of Death in The Duke of Death and His Maid).
 June 29:
 Tajja Isen, Canadian writer, editor and voice actor (voice of Sister Bear in The Berenstain Bears, Jazzi in The Save-Ums!, the title character in Atomic Betty, Samantha in Franklin and the Turtle Lake Treasure, Jane in Jane and the Dragon, Jodie in Time Warp Trio, Princess Pea/Presto in Super Why!, Nessa in My Big Big Friend, singing voice of Franny in Franny's Feet).
 Danielle Weisberg, American television writer and production assistant (The Simpsons).

July
 July 12: Erik Per Sullivan, American former actor (voice of Sheldon in Finding Nemo, Mino and Baby Bug in Arthur and the Invisibles).

August
 August 13: Nikita Hopkins, American actor (voice of Roo in the Winnie the Pooh franchise, young Rudy Buenaventura in The Zeta Project episode "Kid Genius").
 August 28:
 Kyle Massey, American actor (voice of Huntsboy #88 in American Dragon: Jake Long, Milo in Fish Hooks, Mr. Spoony in Mighty Magiswords, Jeremy in Rise of the Teenage Mutant Ninja Turtles, Chad 3000 in the Yin Yang Yo! episode "Skirting the Issue").
 Brian Hull, American actor, impressionist and internet personality (voice of Dracula in Hotel Transylvania: Transformania, Guy Hilton in Marmaduke, young Sideburns Stabbington in the Rapunzel's Tangled Adventure episode "No Time Like the Past").

September
 September 7: Jennifer Veal, English actress and internet personality (voice of Zhan Tiri in Rapunzel's Tangled Adventure, Ally in Descendants: Wicked World, Princess Magma in the Penn Zero: Part-Time Hero episode "Rockullan, Papyron, Scissorian").
 September 9: Adam Paloian, American animator (The SpongeBob Movie: Sponge Out of Water), character designer (Smiling Friends, The Cuphead Show!), storyboard artist (Pig Goat Banana Cricket, SpongeBob SquarePants, Tig n' Seek), writer and director (SpongeBob SquarePants, The Cuphead Show!).

October 
 October 2: Antony del Rio, American actor (voice of Reptil in The Super Hero Squad Show, Inferno in Avengers Assemble, Kel in Star Wars Resistance, Kyle in She-Ra and the Princesses of Power, Todd in Twelve Forever, Man-At-Arms in He-Man and the Masters of the Universe).
 October 7: Kody Kavitha, Indian-American actress (voice of Sunita in Rise of the Teenage Mutant Ninja Turtles, Samosa in Apple & Onion, Norma Khan in Dead End: Paranormal Park, Saanvi Patel in the We Bare Bears episode "Money Man").
 October 18: Ely Henry, Canadian actor (voice of Bamm-Bamm Rubble in Yabba Dabba Dinosaurs, Calculator in Justice League Action, Fleem in Smallfoot, Goodman in Blade Runner: Black Lotus, Edmund in Where's Waldo?).

November 
 November 1: Anthony Ramos, American actor and musician (voice of King Trollex in Trolls World Tour, Mr. Piranha in The Bad Guys, Tito in the Elena of Avalor episode "Team Isa").

December 
 December 17: Daniel Tay, American actor (voice of the title character in Doogal).
 December 19: 
 Libe Barer, American actress (voice of Violet Sabrewing in DuckTales, Casey in Moon Girl and Devil Dinosaur).
Sumire Uesaka, Japanese voice actress and singer (voice of Hayase Nagatoro in Don't Toy with Me, Miss Nagatoro).
 December 20: 
Jason Szwimer, Canadian voice actor (voice of James in Arthur's Perfect Christmas, D.W. Read in seasons 7-10 of Arthur and Postcards from Buster, Elf in Caillou's Holiday Movie, Phil in The Tofus).
Jillian Rose Reed, American actress (voice of Naomi Turner in Elena of Avalor).
Sarah-Nicole Robles, American actress (voice of Judy in Billy Dilley's Super-Duper Subterranean Summer, Luz Noceda in The Owl House).
 December 26: Eden Sher, American actress (voice of Star Butterfly in Star vs. the Forces of Evil).
 December 31: ND Stevenson, American cartoonist and animation producer (She-Ra and the Princesses of Power).

Deaths

January
 January 12: Keye Luke, Chinese actor (voice of Brak in Space Ghost, Charlie Chan in The Amazing Chan and the Chan Clan, Zoltar and The Great Spirit in Battle of the Planets), dies at age 86.
 January 30: John McIntire, American actor (voice of Rufus in The Rescuers, Mr. Digger in The Fox and the Hound), dies at age 83.

February
 February 1: Jimmy MacDonald, Scottish-American animator, actor, musician and sound effects maker (Walt Disney Company, voice of Mickey Mouse from 1948-1977, original voice of Chip, Gus and Jaq, and Humphrey the Bear, the unlucky wolf in The Sword in the Stone), dies at age 84.
 February 2: Franco Latini, Italian voice actor (dub voice of Donald Duck and Tom Cat), dies at age 63.
 February 3: Nancy Kulp, American actress (voice of Frou-Frou in The Aristocats), dies at age 69.

March
 March 4: Vance Colvig, American clown and voice actor (voice of Chopper in The Yogi Bear Show), dies at age 72.
 March 14: Howard Ashman, American playwright and lyricist (Walt Disney Animation Studios), dies at age 40.
 March 26: Lechosław Marszałek, Polish film and television director (Reksio, worked on Bolek i Lolek, Studio Filmów Rysunkowych), dies at age 69.

April
 April 10: Natalie Schafer, American actress (voice of Lovey Howell in The New Adventures of Gilligan and Gilligan's Planet), dies at age 91.
 April 19: Frederik Bramming, Danish animator and comics artist (made advertising animated shorts for Bergenholz), dies at age 79.
 April 25: Carl Brandt, American musician (The Dick Tracy Show, The Famous Adventures of Mr. Magoo, Tom & Jerry), dies at age 76.
 April 28: Ken Curtis, American singer and actor (voice of Nutsy the vulture in Robin Hood), dies at age 74. 
 April 30: Roy Seawright, American special effects maker and animator (Babes in Toyland, One Million B.C.), dies at age 85.

May
 May 14: Joy Batchelor, English animator, film producer and director (Halas & Batchelor, Animal Farm, the animated music video of Love Is All by Roger Glover), dies at age 77.

August
 August 4: Don DaGradi, American writer (Walt Disney Animation Studios), dies at age 80.

September
 September 3: Frank Capra, Italian-born American director, producer and writer (creator of Private Snafu, directed Our Mr. Sun and Hemo the Magnificent), dies at age 94.
 September 14: Lisa Michelson, American voice actress (English dub voice of Satsuki Kusakabe in My Neighbor Totoro and Kiki in Kiki's Delivery Service), dies in a car accident at age 33.
 September 24: Dr. Seuss, American children's novelist, illustrator, animator and comics artist (Warner Bros. Cartoons), dies at age 87.
 September 27: Floyd Huddleston, American songwriter (The Aristocats, Robin Hood), dies at age 73.
 September 29: Ed Barge, American animator (Harman-Ising, MGM, Hanna-Barbera, Ralph Bakshi), dies at age 81.

October
 October 26: Henry Wilson Allen, aka Heck Allen, American novelist and animation writer (Barney Bear, worked for Tex Avery), dies at age 79.

November
 November 11: Morton Stevens, American composer (Tiny Toon Adventures), dies from pancreatic cancer at age 62.
 November 25: Eleanor Audley, American actress (voice of Lady Tremaine in Cinderella and Maleficent in Sleeping Beauty), dies at age 86.
 November 27: Harry Everett Smith, American experimental filmmaker (Early Abstractions, Heaven and Earth Magic), dies at age 68.

December
 December 29: Tony Strobl, American animator and comics artist (Walt Disney Company, scriptwriter for Duck Tales), dies at age 76.

Specific date unknown
 David Hamilton Grant, English pornographic producer and convicted criminal (Snow White and the Seven Perverts), dies at age 52 of an alleged contract killing.

See also 
 1991 in anime

Sources

External links 
Animated works of the year, listed in the IMDb

 
1990s in animation